Eric Johnson may refer to:

Music
Eric Johnson (guitarist) (born 1954) an American guitarist and recording artist
Eric D. Johnson (born 1976), member of multiple indie-rock bands including Fruit Bats, The Shins and Califone

Politics
Eric Johnson (Georgia politician) (born 1953), state senator
Eric Johnson (Texas politician) (born 1975), Mayor of Dallas 
Eric Johnson (British politician) (1897–1978), British Conservative Party politician

Sports

American football
Eric Johnson (defensive back) (born 1976), American football linebacker
Eric Johnson (tight end) (born 1979), American football tight end
Eric Johnson (defensive tackle) (born 1998), American football defensive tackle

Other sportspeople
Eric Johnson (golfer) (born 1962), American golfer
Eric Johnson (basketball) (born 1966), American former basketball player
Eric Johnson (Australian sportsman) (1902–1976), Australian rules footballer and cricketer
Eric Johnson (footballer) (born 1944), English former footballer

Other
Eric Vale (born 1974), American voice actor sometimes credited as Eric Johnson
Eric Johnson (actor) (born 1979), Canadian actor
Eric Johnson (journalist), American news and sports reporter in Seattle
Eric A. Johnson (born 1948), American historian and professor of history
Eric J. Johnson, professor of marketing at Columbia University
Eric Johnson (theologian), professor at Southern Baptist Theological Seminary

See also
Erik Johnson (born 1988), American ice hockey defenseman
Erik Johnson (disambiguation)
Eric Johnston (disambiguation)